This article covers the phonology of the Uyghur language.  Uyghur, a Turkic language spoken primarily in the Xinjiang Uyghur Autonomous Region features both vowel harmony and vowel reduction.

Vowels

Uyghur vowels are by default short, but long vowels also exist because of historical vowel assimilation (above) and through loanwords.  Underlyingly long vowels would resist vowel reduction and devoicing, introduce non-final stress, and be analyzed as |Vj| or |Vr| before a few suffixes. However, the conditions in which they are actually pronounced as distinct from their short counterparts have not been fully researched.

 only occurs in words of non-Turkic origin and as the result of vowel raising.

Vowel reduction
Uyghur has two processes of systematic vowel reduction (or vowel raising):
The former process is applied before the latter; As with other phenomena, long vowels are exempt.  For example:
  →  (cf. Turkish alın) 'take!'
  →  (cf.
  →  (cf. Turkish atım) 'my horse')
  →  'my feather' (in some loanwords, vowel raising does not occur)

Vowel harmony
Uyghur, like other Turkic languages, displays vowel harmony. Words usually agree in vowel backness, but compounds, loans, and some other exceptions often break vowel harmony. Suffixes surface with the rightmost [back] value in the stem, and /e, ɪ/ are transparent (as they don't contrast for backness). Uyghur also has rounding harmony.

Consonants

Uyghur voiceless stops are aspirated word-initially and intervocalically. This devoicing process is usually reflected in the official orthography, but an exception has been recently made for certain Perso-Arabic loans. Voiceless phonemes do not become voiced in standard Uyghur.

Suffixes display a slightly different type of consonant alternation. Devoicing of a suffix-initial consonant can occur only in the cases of  → ,  → , and  → , when the preceding consonant is voiceless.

Similarly,  tends to become  before another consonant.

Uyghur displays vocalic assimilation, atypical among Turkic languages. This phenomenon occurs most common in colloquial speech, but is often avoided when reciting, reading, or singing. As a result, Uyghur speakers often hypercorrect by inserting an  after a long vowel where there is no phonemic , especially after attaching a vowel-initial suffix (e.g. bina 'building',  or  'my building'). In addition, although this is not represented orthographically, a few cases of "r-deletion" have been lexicalized, such as تۆت töt ('four').

Other phonemes occur natively only in limited contexts, i.e.  only in few interjections, and  rarely initially, and  only morpheme-final. Therefore, the pairs *, *, and * do not alternate.

Phonotactics
The primary syllable structure of Uyghur is CV(C)(C). Uyghur syllable structure is usually CV or CVC, but CVCC can also occur in some words. When syllable-coda clusters occur, CC tends to become CVC in some speakers especially if the first consonant is not a sonorant. In general, Uyghur phonology tends to simplify phonemic consonant clusters by means of elision and epenthesis.

References

Notes

General 
 Abdurehim, Esmael (2014), The Lopnor dialect of Uyghur - A descriptive analysis (PDF),Publications of the Institute for Asian and African Studies 17, Helsinki: Unigrafia, 
 
 
 
 

Uyghur language
Turkic phonologies